A number of vessels have been named Bonavista, including:

, a cargo liner built for the Canadian National Railway
, a ferry in service 1999–2001

Ship names